72 Dangerous Animals: Asia is a 2018 Australian nature documentary exploring Asia's most deadly animals, starring Bob Brisbane, Bryan Grieg Fry and Romulus Whitaker

Premise
72 Dangerous Animals: Asia explores Asia's 72 most deadly animals competing for the ultimate title of Most Dangerous Animal in Asia. It features interviews with wildlife experts and survivors of attacks.

Cast
 Bob Brisbane
 Bryan Grieg Fry
 Romulus Whitaker
 Paul Rosolie
 Jamie Seymour
 Jonathon Young
 Warren Savary
 Boone Smith
 Gregory Erickson
 Richard Fitzpatrick 
 Subarai Rajathurai
Luiz A. Rocha
 Deepak Shimkhada
 Wong Siew Te

Episodes 
Below are the species shown in the program, in order of appearance and the position they obtained in the episode according to their potential threat to humans.

Wrong Place, Wrong Time 
 Asian rhinoceros (3rd place)
 Leopard (1st place)
 Asian forest centipede (5th place)
 Orangutan (6th place)
 Toxic flower urchin (4th place)
 Saw-scaled viper (2nd place)

Jaws and Claws 
 Golden eagle (4th place)
 Coconut crab (6th place)
 Pacific water sharks (2nd place)
 Camel spider (5th place)
 Sun bear (3rd place)
 Saltwater crocodile (1st place)

Chemical Warfare 
 Slow loris (7th place)
 Black rat (2nd place)
 Fat-tailed scorpion (3rd place)
 Indian cobra (1st place)
 Poisonous toad (5th place)
 Rove beetle (6th place)
 Stingray (4th place)

Deadly: Fact or Folklore 
 Langur monkey (4th place)
 Tiger (1st place)
 Joro spider (7th place)
 Tomistoma (3rd place)
 Asian needle ant (6th place)
 Otter (5th place)
 King Cobra (2nd place)

Accidental Assassins 
 Water buffalo (2nd place)
 Needlefish (6th place)
 Toxic crab (4th place)
 Mugger crocodile (3rd place)
 Box jellyfish (1st place)
 Reticulated python (5th place)

Pretty and Painful 
 Cone snail (3rd place)
 Asiatic black bear (2nd place)
 Red panda (7th place)
 Blue Malayan coral snake (4th place)
 Eurasian lynx (5th place)
 Asian elephant (1st place)
 Red lionfish (6th place)

The Road Less Travelled 
 Asiatic lion (2nd place)
 Komodo dragon (1st place)
 Electric ray (6th place)
 Golden jackal (5th place)
 Wolverine (4th place)
 Striped eel catfish (7th place)
 Brown bear (3rd place)

Urban Jungle 
 Wild boar (5th place)
 Street dog (2nd place)
 Pufferfish (6th place)
 Indian red scorpion (4th place)
 Asian tiger mosquito (1st place)
 Common krait (3rd place)

Corner Me, I'll Fight 
 Wolf (3rd place)
 Stonefish (2nd place)
 Malayan porcupine (7th place)
 Sloth bear (1st place)
 Gibbon (5th place)
 Snow leopard (6th place)
 Tarantula (4th place)

The Bold and the Brutal 
 Honey badger (4th place)
 Russell's viper (1st place)
 Triggerfish (6th place)
 Macaque (3rd place)
 Yak (5th place)
 Blue ringed octopus (2nd place)

Big! Banded! and Billed! 
 Giant moray eel (4th place)
 Gaur (2nd place)
 Banded sea krait (3rd place)
 Asian forest scorpion (7th place)
 Gharial (6th place)
 Billfish (5th place)
 Asian giant hornet (1st place)

Fearsome Finalists 
11- Komodo dragon10- Asian giant hornet9- Sloth bear8- Asian tiger mosquito7- Leopard6- Tiger5- Asian elephant4- Indian cobra3- Saltwater crocodile2- Russell's viper1- Box jellyfish

Run order:

1 - Leopard (7th)

2 - Komodo dragon (11th)
 
3 - Asian Elephant (5th)

4 - Sloth Bear (9th)

5 - Indian Cobra (4th)

6 - Asian Giant Hornet (10th)

*Countdown of non-finalist contenders*

7 - Tiger (6th)

8 - Saltwater Crocodile (3rd)

9 - Asian Tiger Mosquito (8th)

10 - Box Jellyfish (1st)

11 - Russell's Viper (2nd)

Release
It was released on 10 August 2018, on Netflix streaming.

References

External links
 

2018 Australian television series debuts
2010s Australian documentary television series
English-language Netflix original programming
Netflix original documentary television series
Television series about mammals
Television series about birds
Television series about arthropods
Television series about fish
Television series about reptiles and amphibians